Donald Sage Mackay, Baron Mackay of Drumadoon, PC (30 January 1946 – 21 August 2018) was a British judge of the Supreme Courts of Scotland, and a Lord Advocate, the country's senior Law Officer. He was also one of five additional Lords of Appeal in the House of Lords, where he sat as a crossbencher.

Early life
Mackay was born to Donald George Mackintosh Mackay and Jean Margaret Mackay, and educated at the private George Watson's College, Edinburgh. He was the brother of the BBC news reporter Alan Mackay.

He studied at the School of Law of the University of Edinburgh (LLB, LLM), and at the School of Law of the University of Virginia (LLM).

Mackay was admitted as a solicitor in 1971 and practised for five years with Allan McDougall & Company SSC, becoming a member of the Society of Solicitors in the Supreme Courts of Scotland in 1973, before being admitted to the Faculty of Advocates in 1976. From 1982 to 1985, he served as an Advocate Depute, a prosecutor in the High Court, and took silk in 1987. From 1988 to 1992, he served as a temporary sheriff, and from 1989 to 1995 sat on the Board of the Criminal Injuries Compensation Authority.

Government
In 1995, he replaced Thomas Dawson as Solicitor General for Scotland on the other's appointment as a judge of the Supreme Courts of Scotland, and later that year succeeded Lord Rodger of Earlsferry as Lord Advocate, on the other's appointment as Lord President of the Court of Session and Lord Justice General, the most senior judge in Scotland. He was duly created a life peer on 13 December 1995, as Baron Mackay of Drumadoon, of Blackwaterfoot in the District of Cunninghame, and became a Privy Counsellor in 1996. Prior to Scottish devolution in 1999, the Lord Advocate was a political appointment, therefore the Conservative defeat in the 1997 general election, saw Mackay replaced by Labour's Lord Hardie. Between May 1997 and March 2000, he combined practice as a senior counsel with an active role in the House of Lords as Opposition Spokesman on Scotland and Constitutional Affairs.

The bench
Mackay was appointed a judge of the Court of Session and High Court of Justiciary, Scotland's highest courts, in March 2000. Mackay was also one of five members of the House of Lords, in addition to the twelve Lords of Appeal in Ordinary, eligible to form the quorum of the House required to hear and determine judicial business under ss.5&25 of the Appellate Jurisdiction Act 1876. In October 2009 the judicial functions of the House of Lords were transferred to the new Supreme Court of the United Kingdom under Part 3 of the Constitutional Reform Act 2005, with the twelve Lords of Appeal in Ordinary becoming the inaugural Justices of the Court. While ss.38 and 39 allow for additional judges to sit in the Court, Mackay's position as a serving judge of the Outer House of the Court of Session excluded him from both of these provisions.

He retired from the membership of the House of Lords on 17 January 2017.

See also
List of Senators of the College of Justice

References

1946 births
2018 deaths
People educated at George Watson's College
Alumni of the University of Edinburgh
Scottish politicians
Mackay of Drumadoon
Mackay of Drumadoon
Members of the Faculty of Advocates
Members of the Privy Council of the United Kingdom
Scottish King's Counsel
20th-century King's Counsel
Solicitors General for Scotland
Lord Advocates
University of Virginia School of Law alumni
Crossbench life peers
Life peers created by Elizabeth II